Wan Shenzi (1856–1923), born in Luzhou, Sichuan, was one of the most famous Chinese couplet writers in the late Qing Dynasty. He composed more than 400 couplets in his life.

His most famous couplet is located at Du Fu Thatched Cottage of Chengdu:
名望重三唐，是谁敌手？陵厉骚坛，春树暮云，竞传白也诗篇上；
遭逢同五代，故事回头，纵谈天宝，秋风茅屋，令我呜呼感慨多。

External links 
 Book By Wan Shen Zi

1856 births
1923 deaths
Qing dynasty poets
Republic of China poets
Writers from Luzhou
Poets from Sichuan